Euglesa is a genus of bivalves belonging to the family Sphaeriidae.

Species:

Euglesa adamsi 
Euglesa atkinsoniana 
Euglesa cara 
Euglesa casertana 
Euglesa cavatica 
Euglesa centrale 
Euglesa chankensis 
Euglesa clausi 
Euglesa compressa 
Euglesa conventus 
Euglesa coreana 
Euglesa edlaueri 
Euglesa equilateralis 
Euglesa etheridgei 
Euglesa ethiopica 
Euglesa fallax 
Euglesa ferruginea 
Euglesa floresiana 
Euglesa fultoni 
Euglesa globularis 
Euglesa granum 
Euglesa gurvichi 
Euglesa hallae 
Euglesa henslowana 
Euglesa hinzi 
Euglesa interstitialis 
Euglesa korniushini 
Euglesa kosciusko 
Euglesa lilljeborgii 
Euglesa ljovuschkini 
Euglesa lyudmilae 
Euglesa maasseni 
Euglesa milium 
Euglesa mongolica 
Euglesa novaezelandiae 
Euglesa paludosa 
Euglesa personata 
Euglesa ponderi 
Euglesa ponderosa 
Euglesa pulchella 
Euglesa sarmatica 
Euglesa semenkevitschi 
Euglesa shcherbinai 
Euglesa subtruncata 
Euglesa tasmanica 
Euglesa trigonoides 
Euglesa waldeni 
Euglesa zugmayeri

References

Sphaeriidae
Bivalve genera